Enteromius martorelli is a species of ray-finned fish in the genus Enteromius.

References 

 

Enteromius
Taxa named by Benigno Román
Fish described in 1971